Phytoecia caerulea is a species of beetle in the family Cerambycidae. It was described by Scopoli in 1772, originally under the genus Leptura. It has a wide distribution in Europe.

Subspecies
 Phytoecia caerulea caerulea (Scopoli, 1772)
 Phytoecia caerulea bethseba Reiche & Saulcy, 1858
 Phytoecia caerulea gilvimana Ménétriés, 1832

References

Phytoecia
Beetles described in 1772
Taxa named by Giovanni Antonio Scopoli